Lê Xuân Tú (born 6 September 1999) is a Vietnamese professional football player who plays as forward for Hà Nội in V.League 1

International career

International goals

U-19

U-23

Honours
Hồng Lĩnh Hà Tĩnh
V.League 2: 2019 
Hà Nội
V.League 1: 2022
Vietnamese National Cup: 2020, 2022
Vietnamese Super Cup: 2020, 2021

External links

References

1999 births
Living people
Vietnamese footballers
Vietnam youth international footballers
Association football forwards
V.League 1 players